After Midnight (German: Ab Mitternacht) is a 1938 French-German drama film directed by Carl Hoffmann and starring Gina Falckenberg, Peter Voß and René Deltgen. It was shot as a German-language version of the French film Nights of Princes, produced as a co-production between the French subsidiary of Tobis Film and the producer Joseph N. Ermolieff. Such multiple-language versions were common during the decade. Both films were based on the 1927 novel Nights of Princes by Joseph Kessel.

It was shot at the Epinay Studios in Paris. The film's sets were designed by the art directors Alexandre Lochakoff and Vladimir Meingard.

Synopsis
Helene performs in a Paris nightclub run by White Russian exiles. When a her husband, an engineer she believed had died in the Russian Civil War, reappears she tries to assist him. However, this opens her to blackmail by her dancing partner Fedor.

Cast
 Gina Falckenberg as Helene
 Peter Voß as Petroff
 René Deltgen as Fedor
 Marina Shubert as Vera
 Alexander Engel as Wronski
 Hubert von Meyerinck as Ricin
 Nicolas Koline as Schuwaloff
 Eva Tinschmann as Mme. Mesureux
 Katja Bennefeld as Secretary
 Hertha Windschild as Yvette

References

Bibliography
 Goble, Alan. The Complete Index to Literary Sources in Film. Walter de Gruyter, 1999.

External links

1938 films
1938 drama films
German drama films
French drama films
Films of Nazi Germany
1930s German-language films
Films directed by Carl Hoffmann
German multilingual films
Films shot at Epinay Studios
Tobis Film films
Films set in Paris
German black-and-white films
French black-and-white films
French multilingual films
1938 multilingual films
Films based on French novels
1930s German films
1930s French films